Williams Creek may refer to:
United States
 Williams Creek, Indiana, a town
 Williams Creek (Cole Camp Creek), a stream in Missouri
 Williams Creek (Fishing River), a stream in Missouri
 Williams Creek (Spring River), a stream in Missouri
 Williams Creek, South Dakota, a township
 Williams Creek Natural Area, a protected area of Hinsdale County, Colorado
 Williams Creek (Texas), a river in Texas
 Williams Creek (Florida), a stream in Florida
Canada
 Williams Creek (British Columbia), a historically important gold-bearing creek in British Columbia, Canada